Nävsjön is a lake in Sweden.  It straddles the boundary between Norrköping Municipality in Östergötland County and Nyköping Municipality in Södermanland County.

Lakes of Södermanland County
Lakes of Östergötland County